Francisco López de Osornio Merlo (1681 – 1756) was a Spanish military leader and landowner, who served during the Viceroyalty of Peru as Captain of the provincial militias of Buenos Aires.

Biography 

He was born on September 7, 1681 in Buenos Aires, the son of Francisco López Osornio and Tomasa Merlo, belonging to an illustrious family of Spanish and Creole origin. He was married on September 11, 1701 in Metropolitan Cathedral to María Gamiz de las Cuevas, daughter of Pedro Gamiz de las Cuevas and Tomasa Álvarez de Lasarte, a distinguished Spanish family from Madrid. His son Clemente López de Osornio, a landowner belonging to the Spanish Army, died assassinated during an indigenous incursion to the Province of Buenos Aires. 

He had an active participation in the military expeditions aimed at controlling the indigenous advance towards the Province of Buenos Aires. He held the honorific post of Alférez Real of the city, being the one in charge to carry the Estandarte Real in the day of Saint Martin of Tours. 

In 1726 he had served as commander of the Fort of Barragán, place where had ordered the construction of the first chapel.

References 

1681 births
1750s deaths
People from Buenos Aires
Argentine people of Spanish descent
Spanish colonial governors and administrators